Isho Shiba (born 18 September 1986 in Baghdad, Iraq) is an Assyrian-Canadian boxer.

He is an ethnic Assyrian and was born in Baghdad, Iraq. He currently resides in Hamilton, Canada. He trains at McGrorys Boxing club in Hamilton. He is a six time Canadian Champion. Shiba was 2006 Rookie of the Year and 2006 Athlete of the Year. He has appeared in the Pan American Games and Commonwealth Games. He has also been in some AIBA World Boxing Championships and Summer Olympic Games qualifiers.

Boxing career 
Shiba started boxing when he was around 11 years old and has been boxing since 1997 with the same coaches at the same boxing club, McGrory's Boxing Club in Hamilton.

Shiba was originally inspired by fellow Assyrian Zaya Younan, who is also from Hamilton. Zaya helped Shiba reach his dreams and goals. Isho was a junior boxer for six years and won two Junior Canadian Championships. The first championship that Isho won was in February 2004 in Quebec. "It was a great feeling to win after all the hard work and dedication." The second championship was in February 2005 in Brantford, Ontario.

In January 2006, Shiba became a senior boxer. The first senior championship he participated in was the Ontario Championships. In November 2005, he won a gold medal in the Ontario Championships.

In January 2006, Shiba went to the Canadian Championships in St. Catharines, Ontario, as a 54 kg boxer. He competed against a four-time Canadian Champion and defeated him to become the new champion. He won the award for 2006 Best Rookie of the year and also 2006 Best Athlete of the year.

Shiba has said, "Boxing has become my passion for life, my passion for success. I appreciate the support from my family, friends, and my Assyrian community. I especially thank God for lighting my way and leading me to success."

Shiba travelled to Iraq in March 2012 to fight for the Iraqi national team. He stayed at a training camp in Baghdad, Iraq. The Iraqi Olympic Association could not finalise his papers in time for the 2012 Summer Olympics Qualifiers in Kazakhstan so he was not able to compete there.

Personal life 
Shiba stated in an interview that his heroes are Oscar De La Hoya, Marco Antonio Barrera, and his longtime coach Vinnie Ryan.

Shiba is an Assyrian. He left Iraq at a young age due to the Iran–Iraq War in the 1980s. His family ran to Turkey and stayed in a refugee camp for several months until fleeing to Greece for a year until they were accepted into Canada in 1989. His parents, Isho Shiba Sr. and Polin, are both from the villages in the Barwari Region of Northern Iraq in the Dohuk Governorate.

References 

Living people
Sportspeople from Baghdad
Canadian people of Assyrian descent
1986 births
Iraqi emigrants to Canada
Canadian male boxers
Boxing people from Ontario
Commonwealth Games competitors for Canada
Boxers at the 2006 Commonwealth Games
Pan American Games competitors for Canada
Boxers at the 2007 Pan American Games
Lightweight boxers